Isle of Intrigue is a 1931 Australian film directed by A. R. Harwood. It was one of the first Australian talking movies.

Plot
The pearling schooners of a trading firm are being robbed by a mysterious pirate. The son of the owner of the firm (James Alexander) goes to the South Pacific island of Avita to investigate and uncover the pirate's identity, vindicating a man who has been unjustly accused. He also has a romance.

Cast
 James Alexander
 Helene Best
 John Cairns
 Darcy Kelway
 Norman Shepherd
 Dorothy Stanward

Production
The film was filmed and released simultaneously with Spur of the Moment (1931), using many of the same cast and crew.

Reception
Reviews were generally positive.

References

External links
 
Isle of Intrigue at National Film and Sound Archive
Isle of Intrigue at Oz Movies

1931 films
Australian adventure films